Henryk Mieczysław Jagodziński (born 1 January 1969) is a Polish priest of the Catholic Church who has been named Apostolic Nuncio to Ghana with the rank of archbishop.

Biography
Henryk Jagodziński was born in Małogoszcz, Poland, on 1 January 1969. He attended the Higher Theological Seminary in Kielce. He was ordained a priest of the Diocese of Kielce on 3 June 1995 by Bishop Kazimierz Ryczan. He holds a degree in canon law. He did parish work in Busko-Zdrój for two years and then studied in Rome, earning a doctorate in canon law at the Pontifical University of the Holy Cross. He also studied at the Vatican training institute for diplomats, the Pontifical Ecclesiastical Academy.

He entered the diplomatic service of the Holy See on 1 July 2001. His early assignments included stints in the offices representing the Holy See in Belarus from 2001 to 2005, Croatia from 2005 to 2008, in the Section for Relations with States of the Secretariat of State in Rome, and in India from 2015 to 2018, and Bosnia and Herzegovina from 2018 to 2020.

On 3 May 2020, Pope Francis appointed him titular archbishop of Limosano and Apostolic Nuncio to Ghana.

He is the author of scholarly articles that have appeared in Kieleckie Studia Teologiczne (Kielce Theological Studies). Among his books is a personal testament: Wiara kapłana (A Priest's Faith) (2014).

See also
 List of heads of the diplomatic missions of the Holy See

References

Living people
1969 births
People from Jędrzejów County
Pontifical Ecclesiastical Academy alumni
Apostolic Nuncios to Ghana
Pontifical University of the Holy Cross alumni